The Masonic Temple of El Dorado, Arkansas is located at 106-108 North Washington Street, on the west side of the courthouse square.  The four-story masonry building was built in 1923–24 to a design by Little Rock architect Charles S. Watts.  It is one of a small number of buildings in Arkansas with Art Deco styling influenced by the Egyptian Revival.  This particular styling was likely influence by the 1922 discovery of the Tomb of Tutankhamun.

The building was listed on the National Register of Historic Places in 2001, and included in the El Dorado Commercial Historic District in 2003.

See also
National Register of Historic Places listings in Union County, Arkansas

References

Former Masonic buildings in Arkansas
Clubhouses on the National Register of Historic Places in Arkansas
Masonic buildings completed in 1924
Buildings and structures in El Dorado, Arkansas
Art Deco architecture in Arkansas
Egyptian Revival architecture in Arkansas
Individually listed contributing properties to historic districts on the National Register in Arkansas
National Register of Historic Places in Union County, Arkansas
1924 establishments in Arkansas